Gilford is a village in County Down, Northern Ireland. The village sits on the River Bann between the towns of Banbridge, Tandragee and Portadown. It covers the townlands of Loughans, Ballymacanallen and Drumaran. It had a population of 1,573 people in the 2001 Census. Gilford is within the Armagh, Banbridge and Craigavon
district.

History
Following the Irish Rebellion of 1641, Captain John Magill acquired land in the parish of Tullylish and founded Gilford, the name of the village being derived from "Magill’s ford". He afterwards became Sir John Magill and built Gill Hall in Dromore, County Down.

The Magill lands passed by marriage to the Meade family, who were made Barons Gillford in 1766 and later earls of Clanwilliam. In the 19th century, Gilford grew and its population swelled when a linen mill was built. Many mill houses can still be found in the village. When the mill shut in 1986, the village waned. Recently though, the village has started to recover and new shops have opened. At the edge of the village is Gilford Castle, a mansion built in 1865 to the designs of architect William Spence.

For information about the Troubles in Gilford, see The Troubles in Gilford.

Tanderagee and Gilford railway station was opened in 1852 to serve the villages closing in 1965.

Education
There are two schools in the area: Gilford Primary School and St John's Primary School. The schools are within the Southern Education and Library Board area.
There is a nursery located in Gilford Primary School.

Sport
Millpark Cricket Club plays in the NCU Senior League. Gilford Crusaders Football Club play in Division 3 of the Mid-Ulster Football League.
Gilford Boxing Club has produced All-Ireland winners after All-Ireland winners. It was formed by Bernard McComiskey and is situated in the old church hall beside Gilford chapel.

People
Charlie Gallogly (1919–1993) was a professional footballer in England
Jude Hill (b. 2010), child actor known for his lead role in Kenneth Branagh's film Belfast (2021).

Demography
Gilford is classified as a village by the Northern Ireland Statistics and Research Agency (NISRA) (i.e. with population between 1,000 and 2,250 people). On Census day (29 April 2001) there were 1,573 people living in Gilford. Of these:
22.7% were aged under 16 and 14.6% were aged 60 and over
50.2% of the population were male and 49.8% were female
51.0% were from a Catholic background and 47.0% were from a Protestant background
3.8% of people aged 16–74 were unemployed.

References

Villages in County Down
Civil parish of Tullylish